Charles Fraser may refer to:

 Charles Fraser (artist) (1782–1860), American miniature painter
 Charles Fraser (botanist) (1788–1831), botanist and explorer of Australia
 Charles Fraser (ice hockey) (1897–1970), ice hockey player
 Charles Fraser (missionary), missionary with the Scottish Missionary Society to Russian Tatary
 Charles Fraser (rugby league) (1893–1981), Australian rugby league footballer and coach
 Charles Fraser (surgeon), American heart surgeon
 Charles 'Pop' Fraser (1915–1994), South African military commander
 Charles Craufurd Fraser (1829–1895), Victoria Cross recipient
 Charles Torquil de Montalt Fraser (born 1960), High Sheriff of West Sussex in 2006–2007
 Charles Fraser (footballer) (born 1907), English professional footballer
 Charles Fraser (minister) (1823–1886), New Zealand minister, educationalist and journalist
 Charles Fraser (businessman) (born 1928), Scottish businessman
 Charles E. Fraser (1929–2002), real estate developer in South Carolina
 Charles Frederick Fraser (1850–1925), established the Halifax School for the Blind

See also
 Charles Frazer (disambiguation)
 Frasers of Inverallochy for Charles Fraser